Konjara may refer to:

 Konjara ethnic group, also known as Fur people
 Konjara language, also known as Fur language